Damascus is an unincorporated community in Harlem and Waddams townships, Stephenson County, Illinois.

History
Damascus was laid out in 1837. A post office was established in 1854, and remained in operation until 1906.

References

Unincorporated communities in Stephenson County, Illinois
Unincorporated communities in Illinois